South Carolina Highway 413 (SC 413) is a  state highway in the U.S. state of South Carolina. The highway connects Iva and the Belton area.

Route description
SC 413 begins at an intersection with SC 184 (East Green Street) in Iva, Anderson County. The official designation for the highway begins here however signage for SC 413 is shown along SC 184 for one-block to SC 81. SR 413 travels northeast on East Front Street through Iva. It travels to the northeast and crosses over Wilson Creek and Jordan Creek. After it intersects Flat Rock Road, it passes Carswell Baptist Cemetery. The highway crosses Governors Creek just before an intersection with SC 28 (Abbeville Highway). Then, it crosses over the Rocky River. SC 413 enters Ebenezer Crossroads, where it passes Ebenezer Fire Department 23 and intersects SC 185. It crosses Long Branch before it intersects SC 252 (Honea Path Highway). Just a short distance later, it meets its northern terminus, an intersection with U.S. Route 76 (US 76) and US 178 (Belton Highway). Here, the roadway continues as Rutledge Road.

Major intersections

See also

References

External links

SC 413 at Virginia Highways' South Carolina Highways Annex

413
Transportation in Anderson County, South Carolina